The 1978–79 Utah Utes men's basketball team represented University of Utah in the 1978–79 college basketball season.

Roster

Schedule and results

|-
!colspan=9 style=| Regular season

|-
!colspan=9 style=| NCAA tournament

References 

Utah Utes men's basketball seasons
Utah
Utah
1978 in sports in Utah
1979 in sports in Utah